The boundary markers of the original District of Columbia are the 40 milestones that marked the four lines forming the boundaries between the states of Maryland and Virginia and the square of 100 square miles (259 km2) of federal territory that became the District of Columbia in 1801 (see: Founding of the District of Columbia). Working under the supervision of three commissioners that President George Washington had appointed in 1790 in accordance with the federal Residence Act, a surveying team that Major Andrew Ellicott led placed these markers in 1791 and 1792.  Among Ellicott's assistants were his brothers Joseph and Benjamin Ellicott, Isaac Roberdeau, George Fenwick, Isaac Briggs and an African American astronomer, Benjamin Banneker.

Today, 36 of the original marker stones survive as the oldest federally placed monuments in the United States.  Thirteen of these markers are now within Virginia due to the return of the portion of the District south and west of the Potomac River to Virginia in 1846 (see: District of Columbia retrocession).

Geography

The District of Columbia (initially, the Territory of Columbia) was originally specified to be a square  in area, with the axes between the corners of the square running north-south and east-west, The square had its southern corner at the southern tip of Jones Point in Alexandria, Virginia, at the confluence of the Potomac River and Hunting Creek (later the site of the Jones Point Lighthouse). The specified orientation results in a diamond shape for the District's original boundaries on most maps.

The north-south axis of the District's current boundaries extends southward from the District's north corner near East-West Highway (Maryland Route 410), travels between 17th and 18th Streets, N.W., and continues south across the National Mall to the far shore of the Potomac River; the east-west axis is between the present Constitution Avenue and C Street, N.E. and N.W.

These axes are not the lines used to define the four geographical quadrants of the District (N.E., N.W., S.E., and S.W.), commonly appended to Washington street addresses, which are delimited generally by North Capitol Street, East Capitol Street, South Capitol Street, and the National Mall.  The center of the square is west of the Ellipse and north of the Mall, within the grounds of the headquarters of the Organization of American States.

In 2011, the District of Columbia geographic information system (GIS) program completed a project to map the District's boundary using Global Positioning System (GPS) and contemporary survey technology at an accuracy of +/-  horizontally and +/-  vertically. The GIS program's survey found that (listed in the order in which Andrew Ellicott's team performed the initial boundary survey):

The overall accuracy of the historic survey and the survey using 2011 technology produced remarkably similar results.

The stones are located alongside streets, in public parks, deep in the woods and on personal property.  Homeowners with stones on their property are generally willing to let the curious take a closer look if they are respectful.

Placement of the boundary stones
 On March 30, 1791, President George Washington issued a proclamation that established ″Jones's point, the upper cape of Hunting Creek in Virginia″ as the starting point for the federal territory's boundary survey. Acting in accordance with instructions in the proclamation, the survey team then began its work at the square's south corner on the shoreline of the point, which was at the southeast corner of Alexandria, Virginia.  On April 15, 1791, officials dedicated the south corner stone in an elaborate Masonic ceremony at a point that Andrew Ellicott had determined.

The survey team then cleared a corridor along the boundary route to facilitate surveying, traveling clockwise from the point and placing sandstone boundary markers at the four corners and at intervals of approximately one mile. The markers were quarried near Aquia Creek in Virginia. Most weighed about a half-ton at their emplacement; the four cornerstones were slightly larger. The Virginia stones were set in 1791, and the Maryland ones in 1792.  The map on the web page "Boundary Stones of the District of Columbia" identifies the location of each of the four corner stones, and those of the still-in-place intermediate stones.

The side of a boundary marker that faced the federal territory was inscribed "Jurisdiction of the United States" and with the distance in miles and poles from the previous corner stone. The opposite side was marked with the name of the border state: Virginia or Maryland. The remaining sides were marked with the year that the team placed the stones and with the variation ("Var.") of the compass needle at that place.

On January 1, 1793, Andrew Ellicott submitted to the commissioners a report that stated that the boundary survey had been completed and that all of the boundary marker stones had been set in place.  Ellicott's report described the marker stones and contained a map that showed the boundaries and topographical features of the Territory of Columbia. The map identified the locations within the Territory of the planned City of Washington and its major streets, as well as the location of each boundary marker stone.

The following images show the sides of the Southeast No. 6 boundary marker stone on August 17, 2011:

Protection and historical designations

Protection
In 1906, Fred E. Woodward read a paper to the Columbia Historical Society that described the history, location and conditions of each of the remaining boundary stones, together with photographs of each.  His paper concluded by recommending that the stones be protected by placing small fences around each one.
In 1909,  Ernest A. Shuster of the United States Geological Survey wrote an article for the National Geographic Magazine that described his visits to the 36 remaining boundary stones and that urged their protection and preservation.

In 1915, various local chapters of the Daughters of the American Revolution (DAR) began to place fences around each of the markers. The DAR also placed at the exact center of the original federal territory a marker stone that was located about a half of a mile from the White House and was near the DAR's Memorial Continental Hall.

Historical designations
One Virginia boundary marker was added to the National Register of Historic Places in 1976, and another in 1980.  In 1991, the remaining Virginia boundary markers were added to the National Register in response to a Multiple Property Submission that the Virginia DAR had submitted.  In 1996, 23 marker stones along the boundary between the District of Columbia and Maryland were added to the National Register in response to registration forms that the District of Columbia government had submitted for each of the stones. Each of the District's registration forms referenced the documentation in the Multiple Property Submission for the Virginia markers.

Virginia
Southwest 9. This boundary marker in Falls Church, Virginia was added to the National Register of Historic Places, and further was named a U.S. National Historic Landmark, in 1976 at the instigation of the Afro-American Bicentennial Corporation, which gave the stone its name: Benjamin Banneker: SW-9 Intermediate Boundary Stone. It was the first of the boundary markers to be listed on the National Register of Historic Places.

South Corner. This boundary marker in Virginia was added to the National Register of Historic Places in 1980, together with Alexandria's Jones Point Lighthouse. In 1794, the marker replaced the marker that officials had dedicated during the 1791 Masonic ceremony.

Southwest 1, 2, 3, 4, 5, 6, 7, and 8;  West Corner;  Northwest 1, 2, and 3. These boundary markers in Virginia were added to the National Register of Historic Places on February 1, 1991 in response to the Multiple Property Submission cited above.

District of Columbia and Maryland
Northwest 4, 5, 6, 7, 8, and 9; North Corner; Northeast 2, 3, 4, 5, 6, 7, 8, and 9;  East Corner; Southeast 1, 2, 3, 5, 6, 7, and 9.  These boundary markers, located along the border between the District of Columbia and Maryland, were added to the National Register of Historic Places on November 1, 1996.

Preservation efforts
In 1976, the National Capital Planning Commission published a report that described the history and condition of each boundary stone.  The report recommended that measures be taken to assure the stones' preservation. In 1990 and 1991, a  resurveying team to celebrate the boundary markers' bicentennial located two of the then-missing stones.

In 1995, the Northern Virginia Boundary Stones Committee, whose establishment the Northern Virginia Regional Commission (NVRC) had requested, issued a list of recommendations intended to document and preserve the 14 boundary stones that were located in Virginia. The Committee included representatives of the State of Maryland and of Arlington and Fairfax counties and the cities of Alexandria and Falls Church in Virginia.

In 2008, the NVRC announced that four Virginia local governments, including Arlington and Fairfax counties and the cities of Alexandria and Falls Church, had agreed to help fund a project to protect and preserve the boundary stones by providing matching funds to a Transportation Enhancement Grant that the District Department of Transportation (DDOT) had received from the Federal Highway Administration (FHA). The announcement stated that the NVRC was working on an agreement with the DDOT, the National Park Service and the FHA to administer the project.

However, the preservation project had not yet begun by 2012.  It appeared that the DDOT no longer had the funds that had been allocated for the project. In the meantime, teams of volunteers had begun to landscape and repaint the fences surrounding the stones. In addition, the District of Columbia DAR restored the Northeast No. 7 boundary marker and its fence in 2012.

In 2014, the National Park Service, the historic preservation staff of the District of Columbia Office of Planning, the DDOT and the DAR initiated an effort to rehabilitate the boundary markers that were located along the District's contemporary boundaries. As part of the project, in January 2015 a DDOT crew unearthed a stone buried in 1962 that had replaced Southeast No. 8, with the intention of cleaning and restoring the marker. However, in 2016, the stone was replaced by a new stone that presumably replicated the appearance of the original stone when the original was new.

List of boundary stones
The 36 extant and four missing boundary stones are tabulated in sequence below, beginning at the southern corner and proceeding clockwise, in the same order as the stones were placed.  The tables also contain the year that each stone was listed on the National Register of Historic Places.

Southern corner

Southwestern side

Western corner

Northwestern side

Northern corner

Northeastern side

Eastern corner

Southeastern side

Plaques
Explanatory plaques that are not attached to fences accompany several boundary marker stones, including:

Historical markers 
In 2005, the Arlington County, Virginia, government erected historical markers near the Southwest Nos. 6 and 8 boundary marker stones of the original District of Columbia.

Missing boundary markers
Four of the forty original boundary markers were not in or near their original locations in late 2016. Three of these had been replaced with substitute markers.

District of Columbia entrance markers

A group of entrance markers, erected later along major roads that travel into the District of Columbia, are located on or near the boundary of D.C. and Maryland. Three pairs of marker stones and another single stone are known collectively as the Garden Club of America Entrance Markers. They are all listed on the National Register of Historic Places.

One pair of markers is located within Westmoreland Circle at the junction of Western Avenue and Massachusetts Avenue NW. These markers are between the Northwest No. 5 and Northwest No. 6 boundary markers of the original District of Columbia.
Two similar markers flank Wisconsin Avenue at Western Avenue in Friendship Heights, near the Friendship Heights Metro Station. These markers are between the Northwest No. 6 and Northwest No. 7 boundary markers of the original District of Columbia.
Another pair of markers is located within Chevy Chase Circle, at the junction of Western Avenue and Connecticut Avenue. These markers are between the Northwest No. 7 and Northwest No. 8 boundary markers of the original District of Columbia.
A single marker is located within a traffic island at the intersection of Georgia Avenue, Alaska Avenue and Kalmia Road NW. The marker is located inside the triangular island's southeast corner, near the intersection of Georgia Avenue to the east and Kalmia Road to the south.

 The marker was formerly located inside a median in the center of Georgia Avenue, just north of the Avenue's intersection with Kalmia Road and Alaska Avenue. This marker is between the former site of the Northeast No. 1 and the present site of the Northeast No. 2 boundary markers of the original District of Columbia.

Another D.C. entrance marker stands in a traffic circle (Blair Circle) near downtown Silver Spring, Maryland, at the junction of Eastern Avenue NW, 16th Street NW, N. Portal Drive NW and Colesville Road. The marker is between the North Corner boundary marker and the former site of the Northeast No. 1 boundary marker of the original District of Columbia.

See also
 
 History of Washington, D.C.
 Index of Washington, D.C.-related articles
 List of Registered Historic Places in the District of Columbia
 List of Registered Historic Places in Virginia
 Outline of Washington, D.C.

References

External links

 .
 Boundary Stones Committee, DC Daughters of the American Revolution
 . A tour of the boundary markers
 . 
.
 .
Maps, photos and satellite images
 Locations and individual photographs of 27 boundary markers from zhurnaly.com
 District of Columbia Chapter, Daughters of the American Revolution: "Location of Boundary Stones (Mile Markers)" from dcdar.org
 1906 Map of All D.C. Boundary Stones in \

Initial points
History of Washington, D.C.
Buildings and structures on the National Register of Historic Places in Washington, D.C.
Buildings and structures in Washington, D.C.
Historic surveying landmarks in the United States
National Register of Historic Places in Alexandria, Virginia
National Register of Historic Places in Falls Church, Virginia
National Register of Historic Places in Fairfax County, Virginia
National Register of Historic Places in Arlington County, Virginia
Boundary markers
National Register of Historic Places Multiple Property Submissions